Anna Rędzia (born 2 October 1996) is a Polish footballer who plays as a midfielder for Ekstraliga club UKS SMS Łódź and the Poland women's national team.

References

External links

1996 births
Living people
Women's association football midfielders
Polish women's footballers
Poland women's international footballers
UKS SMS Łódź players